Battisford is a village and civil parish in the Mid Suffolk district of Suffolk, England.

The village contains a Parish Church, a Free Church, a Community Centre - which holds the pre-school playgroup - and a village green, containing a play area. The main road which runs through Battisford is Straight Road, being very straight and over a mile long. The village pub, The Punch Bowl, is a registered Community Interest Company (CIC), and is the very first of its kind in Suffolk.

In 1983, Battisford declared its independence just for one day, from the United Kingdom.

References 

 Battisford Independence Day
 Battisford Parish Council
 Battisford and District Garden Club
 Battisford Free Church

External links

Villages in Suffolk
Mid Suffolk District
Civil parishes in Suffolk